SoapUI is an open-source web service testing application for Simple Object Access Protocol (SOAP) and representational state transfers (REST). Its functionality covers web service inspection, invoking, development, simulation and mocking, functional testing, load and compliance testing. A commercial version, ReadyAPI (formerly SoapUI Pro), which mainly focuses on features designed to enhance productivity, was also developed by Eviware Software AB. In 2011, SmartBear Software acquired Eviware.

SoapUI was initially released to SourceForge in September 2005. It is free software, licensed under the terms of the European Union Public License. Since the initial release, SoapUI has been downloaded more than 2,000,000 times. It is built entirely on the Java platform, and uses Swing for the user interface. This means that SoapUI is cross-platform. Today, SoapUI also supports IDEA, Eclipse, and NetBeans.

SoapUI can test SOAP and REST web services, JMS, AMF, as well as make any HTTP(S) and JDBC calls.

Features

SoapUI
Core features include web services:
 inspection
 invoking
 development
 simulation and mocking
 functional, compliance and security testing

SoapUI Pro
SoapUI Pro is the commercial enterprise version. SoapUI Pro adds a number of productivity enhancements to the SoapUI core, which are designed to ease many recurring tasks when working with SoapUI.

Awards
SoapUI has been given a number of awards. These include:
 Jolt Awards 2014: The Best Testing Tools
 ATI Automation Honors, 2009
 InfoWorld Best of Open Source Software Award, 2008
 SOAWorld Readers' Choice Award, 2007

See also

 Apache JMeter
 Automated testing
 itko
 List of unit testing frameworks
 LoadUI

 Software testing
 System testing
 Test case
 Test-driven development
 TestComplete
 xUnit – a family of unit testing frameworks

References

External links
 
 API Testing Dojo

Free computer programming tools
Cross-platform software
Web service development tools
Software testing tools
2005 software
Software using the European Union Public Licence